The Portland Classic is a women's professional golf tournament in Oregon on the LPGA Tour. Founded  in 1972, the annual event in the Portland area is the oldest continuous event on the LPGA Tour. Tournament Golf Foundation has owned the tournament since its beginning and also managed the Safeway International tournament on the LPGA Tour. It became a 72-hole event in 2013, after decades at 54 holes. 

Proceeds from the tournament are donated to local children's charities; over $19 million has been donated since 1972. The tournament has had a variety of sponsors during its history.

Tournament names
1972: Portland Ladies Classic
1973: Portland Ladies Open
1974–1975: Portland Ladies Classic
1976: Portland Classic1977: LPGA National Team Championship1978: Ping Classic Team Championship1979–1982: Portland Ping Team Championship1983–1985: Portland Ping Championship1986–1989: Cellular One-Ping Golf Championship1990: Ping-Cellular One Golf Championship1991–1994: Ping-Cellular One LPGA Golf Championship1995: Ping-AT&T Wireless Services LPGA Golf Championship1996–2000: Safeway LPGA Golf Championship2001–2002: Safeway Classic2003–2008: Safeway Classic Presented by Pepsi2009–2013: Safeway Classic Presented by Coca-Cola2014: Portland Classic Presented by Cambia Health Solutions2015: Cambia Portland Classic2016–2017: Cambia Portland Classic Presented by JTBC2018–2021: Cambia Portland Classic2022: AmazingCre Portland ClassicHistory
The event began as the Portland Ladies Classic''' in 1972, played at the Portland Golf Club (PGC) in Raleigh Hills for its first two editions. It moved to the Columbia Edgewater Country Club, west of the airport, then returned to PGC in 1975. From 1977 to 1982, the tournament was a team event and its prize money was unofficial. It returned to Columbia Edgewater in 1977, then went to the adjacent Riverside Golf & Country Club in 1980. The three courses rotated as hosts for the tournament until 1990, when Columbia Edgewater became the site for the next 18 editions. In 1978, Ping became a title sponsor. From 1986 to 1995, Cellular One and AT&T Wireless Services also were title sponsors, and in 1996 Safeway took over as the sole title sponsor. The event was moved up on the schedule in 2005, from September to August, and the purse reached $1.7 million in 2007.

In 2009, the tournament moved to the Pumpkin Ridge Golf Club near North Plains, and drew a tournament record crowd of 87,800 at the Ghost Creek Course.  In 2009 and 2010, the course par was increased to 72 for the tournament, as the ninth hole was modified to a par-5; the result was three consecutive reachable par-5's (8,9, & 10) which slowed the pace of play. In 2011, the eighth hole was lengthened and the ninth was returned to a par-4, resulting in a par-71 course (same as public play). The ninth hole was returned to a par-5 in 2012 for a par-72 layout.

In 2013, the tournament moved back to the Columbia Edgewater in Portland and expanded to 72 holes, with a reduced purse of $1.3 million. Safeway dropped its sponsorship after 2013, and Portland-based Cambia Health Solutions became the presenting sponsor.

In 2015, 17-year-old Brooke Henderson Monday-qualified and won the event by eight shots, the largest victory margin on tour since 2012, and became the tour's third-youngest winner. She was only the second Monday qualifier to win on tour and the first in fifteen years, since Laurel Kean in 2000. Henderson was also the first Canadian to win on the LPGA Tour in fourteen years, since Lorie Kane in 2001, and was granted immediate tour membership.

In 2017, Stacy Lewis, a native of Houston, Texas pledged her winnings to relief efforts for Hurricane Harvey pre-tournament. Lewis went on to win the event donating her entire $195,000 purse to hurricane relief efforts.

The 2020 tournament was reduced to 54-holes due to poor air quality caused by wildfires.

The 2021 tournament moved to Oregon Golf Club in West Linn, Oregon. It was reduced to 54 holes due to rain and course conditions.

In 2022, the tournament moved back to Columbia Edgewater Country Club

Venues
As of the 2022 tournament, the Classic has been held at 5 different venues:
 Portland Golf Club 1972–1973, 1975–1976, 1979
 Columbia Edgewater Country Club 1974, 1977–1978, 1982–1983, 1986–1988, 1990–2008, 2013–2020, 2022
 Riverside Golf & Country Club 1980–1981, 1984–1985, 1989
 Pumpkin Ridge Golf Club (Ghost Creek Course) 2009–2012
 Oregon Golf Club 2021

Winners

^ rain-shortened tournament
Note: Green highlight indicates scoring records.

Tournament record

See also
WinCo Foods Portland Open, a current event on the Korn Ferry Tour
Portland Open Invitational, a former event on the PGA Tour

References

External links
Coverage on LPGA Tour's official site
Columbia Edgewater Country Club

LPGA Tour events
Golf in Oregon
Sports in Portland, Oregon
Sports competitions in Oregon
Annual events in Oregon
Safeway Inc.
Recurring sporting events established in 1972
1972 establishments in Oregon
Women's sports in Oregon